The Burabay National Park is a natural park located in Burabay District, in Aqmola Region, Kazakhstan, near Nur-Sultan.

The park was selected as one of the top 10 tourist destinations in Kazakhstan.

The park is under the direct jurisdiction of the President of Kazakhstan.

In the protected area of the national park, economic and leisure activities are prohibited, as the park is under the regulation of nature reserves.

Geography 
The Burabay National Park is located in the Kokshetau Massif, part of the Kokshetau Hills, in the northern sector of the Kazakh Uplands.

History of status 
The first step towards the protection of this natural space was the establishment of the State Forest in 1898. In 1920, Burabay was nationalized and declared a spa town of national importance. In 1935, the "National Nature Reserve of Burabay" was organized. In 1951, the nature reserve was dissolved, replaced by the Burabay Forest. The governmental motion N° 787 of May 6, 1997, transformed the Forest of Burabay into the "Natural and Well-being Complex of the Forest of Burabay", managed by the State. In 2000, the motion N°1246 of August 12 created the "National nature park of Burabay", which covered an area of 83,511 ha, of which 47,600 ha was covered in forest. In 2010, the area of the park was expanded to 129,935 ha. In 2012, 370 ha was converted into spare lands.

Climate 
The climate of Burabay is Humid continental climate, warm summer (Köppen climate classification (Dfb)). The average temperature in the park in January is -16 °C, and +19 °C in July. Precipitation averages around 300 mm yearly. In winter, snow cover is around 25–35 cm thick, and lasts from mid-November to April.

Flora and fauna 
The park contains 757 species of plant, of which 119 are protected, and 12 registered in the Red Book. The forest comprises 65% pines, 31% birches, 3% aspens and 1% shrubs. Many species of edible mushroom can also be found.

Due to the diversity of the flora, the fauna is very abundant: 305 species of animal can be found, which represent 36% of the fauna diversity of Kazakhstan. 40% of them live at the border of their habitat, and 13 species are registered in the Red Book.

Currently, Burabay's forests host a variety of deer including roe deer, moose, wild boar, squirrels, stoats, weasel and marten. Amongst the predators, wolves and lynx might be encountered. In the steppes and wooded areas, fox species, weasels and European and mountain hares might be present, as well as badgers in the forests.

There are a variety of birds, particularly ducks and waders which include common goldeneye, mallard, gadwall, northern pintail, ruddy shelducks, plovers, northern lapwings, common sandpipers and green sandpipers. Ducks numbers rise massively during autumn and during migration periods.

In the dry stony pine forests, and along the forests, the birch wooden steppes, the grey partridge and the capercailie can be found.

Legend 
Many legends evoke Burabay. One of them explains that the Creator only left arid steppes to the nomads of Kazakhstan. Feeling aggrieved, the Kazakh people prayed to God, who gathered all the remaining mountains, forests, lakes and rivers, and threw them towards the steppes. Burabay National Park is also known as "Kazakhstan's pearl".

Kenesary Cave 
Kenesary Cave is a popular tourist destination and photo spot in Burabay. The cave is named after the grandson of the famous Khan Abylai, Kenesary Khan. It is believed that Kenesary Khan spent his childhood here.

Gallery

References and links

Links 
 List of national parks of Kazakhstan
 Official site of the Burabay National Park

References 

Protected areas established in 2000
IUCN Category II
Geography of Akmola Region
National parks of Kazakhstan
Tourist attractions in Akmola Region
Kazakh Uplands